The LNB Pro A Leaders Cup, or French Basketball League Cup, is the annual national league cup competition for teams from the top-tier level of French professional basketball, the LNB Pro A. It was created in its current form in 2003 (after originally being founded in 1988). It is organized by the Ligue Nationale de Basketball (LNB), which also organizes the top two leagues of French professional basketball (Pro A, and Pro B). 

Inspired by the Spanish Copa del Rey (Spanish Basketball King's Cup), the Final Eight format has always been used. At the end of the first half of the regular season, the top eight teams (or the top seven teams and the tournament's host team) from the first division French LNB Pro A League qualify. The eight teams compete in a playoff that is held at one venue over four days, which eventually produces a winner. The Final Eight is one of the highlights of the French basketball calendar. At one point in time, the winner of the competition was entitled to a place in the now defunct FIBA EuroChallenge competition.

History

Tournoi des As (1988 – 1993) 
The Tournoi des As (Tournament of Aces) was the ancestor competition of the current Leaders Cup, being held from 1988 to 1993. At the end of the season, the top 4 teams from the top-tier level French League qualified. Over 2 days of competition, the first placed team of the regular season faced the fourth placed team, and the second placed team faced the third placed team, in semifinals games. The 2 losing teams of the first day would meet for the third place spot, while the two semifinals winners would compete for the cup title.

Semaine des As (2003 – 2012) 

After being interrupted for ten years, the cup returned in 2003, as the Semaine des As (Week of Aces), and it was largely inspired by the Spanish Copa del Rey (Spanish Basketball King's Cup) format. The first edition was organised in Pau, France. The competition was traditionally organized in February. It featured the top eight placed teams of the top-tier level French League, at the end of the regular season's halfway point. It was held in a playoff format over a period of four days. The competition was often highly disputed, producing a different winner every year, except in 2009, when Le Mans won its second title, after previously winning the 2006 edition.

Leaders Cup (2013 – present) 
The Leaders Cup is the current name of the competition. Gravelines beat Strasbourg, by a score of 77–69, in the first edition of the cup competition, that was played under the Leaders Cup name.

Results

Titles by team

See also
 French Pro A League
 French Federation Cup
 French Supercup

References

External links 
 French League Official Site

 
Basketball cup competitions in France
Basketball league cup competitions in Europe